The Fire Station No. 9 in Terre Haute, Indiana was built in 1906.  It was listed on the National Register of Historic Places in 1982.

It is a two-story brick building which was operated as a fire station until 1980.

References

Fire stations on the National Register of Historic Places in Indiana
National Register of Historic Places in Vigo County, Indiana
Fire stations completed in 1906
1906 establishments in Indiana
Buildings and structures in Terre Haute, Indiana